The 2013–14 Basketball Cup of Serbia is the 8th season of the Serbian 2nd-tier men's cup tournament.

Čačak-based team Borac Mozzart Sport won the Cup.

Bracket
Source: Basketball Federation of Serbia

See also 
 2013–14 Radivoj Korać Cup
 2013–14 Basketball League of Serbia

References

External links 
 Basketball Competitions of Serbia

Basketball Cup of Serbia
Cup